Desecration is a British death metal band formed in Newport, south Wales in 1992.

Background
Formed in 1992, and releasing their first demo in 1993, the band caused controversy in 1995 when their debut album Gore and Perversion (original version on Anoxic Records) was infamously seized and incinerated by the local police due to the album's offensive content, for what they deemed to be its obscene nature, and banned upon release. The printers of the original artwork and lyrics, after taking the money for the pressing and without sending any copies to the band, sent the albums to the police authorities and were subsequently incinerated. Band members were arrested. The ensuing court case and media furore firmly established the name Desecration in the South Wales scene and beyond. The album was later released with a black cover featuring the statement "SORRY! Censored by the authorities. Original artwork can be obtained from Arctic Serenades. Send an IRC.", now out of print, by Arctic Serenades.

The album was subsequently re-recorded in 2001 and re-released on 7 April 2003 as Gore & PerVersion 2. It was re-pressed as a white disc edition, the first 50 copies have been signed and numbered by Ollie and Mic and were only available from the band.

The band was told to tone down the lyrics or forget about the music business. This did not happen however, and after three years of fine-tuning their style, Desecration recorded the album Murder in Mind.

The band has since released several albums and gone on many more tours with the likes of Decapitated, Extreme Noise Terror, Vader, Deicide and Morbid Angel.

Band members
The line-up of Desecration has mostly consisted of Ollie Jones and Michael Hourihan, joined by various different bassists and guitarists over the years. Jason Davies played drums from 1994 until 1997, Ollie played drums until Michael joined in 1998. the band's second album had Ollie on drums and upon release Michael joined as drummer.

Current members
 Ollie Jones (Amputated, Extreme Noise Terror)
 bass, drums, vocals, guitar: 1993–present
 Michael Hourihan (Tigertailz, Onslaught, Parricide (aka The Love Grid, a founding member) (UK), Extreme Noise Terror, Akb'al, Perigo Minas, Scruff (bass guitar) (Cardiff), Stormcrow (founding member, Cardiff rock cover band))
 Drums: 1993–1994, 1998–present
 Richard Moore, bass guitar 2019-

Past members
 Andi Morris- bass guitar 2005-2019
 Pete Davies – bass guitar 2003–2005
 Lee Evans – guitars 2002
 Jules Hay – guitars 2001–2002
 Paul Arlett – guitars 1993-1997
 John Young –  bass guitar 1996–2003
 Glenn Thomas – guitars 1993–2001
 Jason Davies – drums 1994–1997
 Mathew Young – drums 1990–1993 (deceased – 2001)                        
 John Waggenaar – guitars 1997-2000

Discography

References

External links 
 

 

People from Newport, Wales
Welsh death metal musical groups
Musical groups established in 1992
British musical trios
1992 establishments in Wales